Alexis Kiah Brown (born October 27, 1994) is an American professional basketball  player for the Los Angeles Sparks of the Women's National Basketball Association (WNBA). She previously played for the Chicago Sky of the Women's National Basketball Association (WNBA).  Brown was the ninth overall pick by the Connecticut Sun in the 2018 WNBA draft. She was traded to the Minnesota Lynx a year later. She played college basketball at the University of Maryland and Duke University.

Early life
Brown was born in Boston, Massachusetts, to Tammy and Dee Brown. Her father played twelve years in the NBA as a point guard, most notably for the Boston Celtics, with whom he won the 1991 Slam Dunk Contest.

High school career
Brown played her freshman season at Dr. Phillips in Orlando, Florida, where she helped the team achieve its first-ever undefeated regular season. After transferring to North Gwinnett in Suwanee, Georgia, she led her team to the state semifinals her junior year and the Class 5-A state championship game her senior year. Brown's high school career also featured stints with the A.O.T. AAU team and an appearance in the 2013 McDonald's All-American Game.

College career
Brown elected to play college basketball at the University of Maryland. Her freshman year, she helped lead the team to the Final Four of the NCAA tournament, earning her the nickname "Big Shot Brown," and was named to the ACC All-Freshmen Team and ACC All-Academic Team. During a breakout sophomore campaign, she averaged 13.3 points per game and received many accolades, including All-Big Ten First Team, All-Big Ten Defensive Team, Big Ten Tournament Most Outstanding Player, Academic All-Big Ten, and AP Third Team All-American. Maryland again reached the Final Four, losing to the eventual champion UConn Huskies.

Wanting to be closer to home, Brown decided to transfer to Duke University following her sophomore year. After sitting out a season due to the NCAA's transfer rules, she worked her way into the starting lineup and helped the Blue Devils get back into the national spotlight. As a junior, Brown set an ACC record by draining 56 consecutive free throws and was named ACC Player of the Week on January 23, 2017.

Professional career

Connecticut Sun
Brown was drafted by the Connecticut Sun as the 9th overall pick in the 2018 WNBA Draft. Brown made her debut on the 20th of May against Las Vegas Aces scoring 5 points in 10 minutes of playing time. She played in 22 games in her rookie season, averaging 1.7 points in 5.6 minutes per game.

After the end of the 2018 WNBA season, Brown signed with CMB Cargo Uni Györ in Hungary's top woman's basketball league.

Minnesota Lynx
After the 2019 WNBA draft, the Minnesota Lynx traded 18th pick Natisha Hiedeman to the Connecticut Sun in order to obtain Brown. Brown played a main role off the bench, as one of the main bench scorers. She scored a career-high 21 points on June 8, when the Lynx played the Los Angeles Sparks. She hit a season-high 5 3-pointers in that game, which she also tied two other times that year - July 24 vs. the Washington Mystics and August 20th vs. the Sparks

Chicago Sky

Brown recently signed a contract, on June 1st, to return to the Chicago Sky after being waived early in 2021 by the Chicago Sky.

Career statistics

WNBA

Regular season

|-
| style="text-align:left;"| 2018
| style="text-align:left;"| Connecticut
| 22 || 0 || 5.6 || .273 || .310 || .571 || 0.8 || 0.5 || 0.2 || 0.0 || 0.4 || 1.7
|-
| style="text-align:left;"| 2019
| style="text-align:left;"| Minnesota
| 33 || 0 || 18.3 || .402 || .385 || .789 || 1.4 || 1.4 || 0.9 || 0.0 || 1.2 || 7.6
|-
| style="text-align:left;"| 2020
| style="text-align:left;"| Minnesota
| 17 || 13 || 22.0 || .342 || .269 || .792 || 1.9 || 2.4 || 1.8 || 0.0 || 1.4 || 6.4
|-
|style="text-align:left;background:#afe6ba;"| 2021
| style="text-align:left;"| Chicago
| 17 || 0 || 9.5 || .263 || .242 || .000 || 0.7 || 1.1 || 0.4 || 0.0 || 0.9 || 1.6
|-
| style="text-align:left;"| 2022
| style="text-align:left;"| Los Angeles
| 34 || 16 || 25.0 || .441 || .398 || .667 || 2.3 || 2.1 || 1.0 || 0.2 || 0.8 || 7.1
|- 
| style="text-align:left;"| Career
| style="text-align:left;"| 5 years, 4 teams
| 123 || 29 || 17.2 || .387 || .356 || .760 || 1.5 || 1.5 || 0.9 || 0.1 || 0.9 || 5.4
|}

Postseason 

|-
| align="left" | 2019
| align="left" | Minnesota
| 1 || 0 || 20.0 || .222 || .167 || .000 || 1.0 || 3.0 || 0.0 || 0.0 || 1.0 || 5.0
|-
|style="text-align:left;background:#afe6ba;"| 2021
| align="left" | Chicago
| 7 || 0 || 3.4 || .333 || .400 || 1.000 || 0.3 || 0.1 || 0.0 || 0.0 || 0.0 || 1.1
|-
| align="left" | Career
| align="left" | 2 years, 2 teams
| 8 || 0 || 5.5 || .267 || .273 || 1.000 || 0.4 || 0.5|| 0.0 || 0.0 || 0.1 || 1.6

College

References

External links
Duke Blue Devils bio

1994 births
Living people
All-American college women's basketball players
American expatriate basketball people in Hungary
American women's basketball players
Basketball players from Georgia (U.S. state)
North Gwinnett High School alumni
Chicago Sky players
Connecticut Sun draft picks
Connecticut Sun players
Duke Blue Devils women's basketball players
Los Angeles Sparks players
Maryland Terrapins women's basketball players
McDonald's High School All-Americans
Minnesota Lynx players
Parade High School All-Americans (girls' basketball)
Point guards
Shooting guards
Basketball players from Boston